Ghasem is an Iranian given name for males. People named Ghasem include:
 Ghasem Dehnavi, Iranian footballer
 Ghasem Hadadifar, Iranian footballer
 Ghasem Rezaei, Iranian wrestler
 Ghasem Sholeh-Saadi, Iranian politician
 Qasem Soleimani, Iranian officer

Iranian masculine given names